In Nigeria, the academic grading system scales from A (First class) to F (fail). Below is the grading system of Nigerian schools.

Nigeria offers six years of basic education, three years of junior secondary education, and three years of senior secondary education. If a student chooses to continue higher education this is then four years of tertiary/university education.

Mathematics and English language are compulsory for all students in Nigeria although maths may not be required for some courses in higher institutions - this is dependent on admissions criteria.

University Grades in Nigeria 

Most Common 

5-point University (Example - University of Lagos)

Postgraduate

Not all universities use merit score - often pass 40%+ or distinction 70% grade given 

Note that NUC (Nigeria University Commission) has expressed strong recommendation to upgrade passing scores in Nigeria universities to 45 which by implication would phase out 40 as pass mark for undergraduate studies. Additionally, to discontinue awarding degrees below 3rd class (if all universities ultimately comply).

International Baccalaureate (IB), Advance Placement (AP) Courses, SATs 
Whilst some international universities recognise WAEC, many others ask Nigerian students for International Baccalaureate (IB) exams or for students to take five or more Advanced Placement (AP) courses, or possibly the first year of an undergraduate degree at a university known as a foundation (course or diploma) if they gain admission with WAEC.

In Nigeria many students who intend to take international exams do entry exams on top of their WAEC. There are arguments against making Nigerian students who clearly qualify to take an additional admission exam. However many top American and EU universities require choice of IB, SAT or ACT and SAT Math 1 or 2 and a science subject test and letters of recommendation depending on the course the student wishes to take.

Joint Admissions and Matriculations (JAMB) 
The Joint Admissions and Matriculations Board (JAMB) is a Nigerian entrance examination board for tertiary-level institutions . Every year, the Joint Admission and Matriculation Board conducts an examination that determines if a student will be admitted to higher education. All of these candidates must have obtained the West Africa School Certificate, now West African Examinations Council, WAEC, or its equivalent National Examination Council (Nigeria), NECO.

West African Senior School Certificate (WASSCE) / WAEC A Levels, GCE 
West African School Certificate (WAEC) replaced the West African General Certificate of Education Ordinary and Advanced levels (GCE ‘O’ and ‘A’ levels) in 1989 and is equivalent to high school / upper secondary passout grades in their 6th year of basic education for admission into Colleges. Many students can use this for direct entry into university in Nigeria, Africa and internationally depending on admissions criteria. 

General Certificate of Education (GCE)

National Examination Council (NECO) 
This is another Nigeria's awarding body school in Nigeria at GCE ‘O’ and ‘A’ levels. The National Common Entrance Examination is administered to pupils in their 6th year of basic education for admission into Colleges. Two examinations are held annually. Students take an exam on Mathematics, General Science and  English and various including Social Studies. 

Structure of the Examination

The National Common Entrance Examination Questions consist of the following:

PAPER I

Part A – Mathematics and General Science Part B – English and Social Studies

PAPER II Part A – Quantitative and Vocational Aptitude Part B – Verbal Aptitude

References 
Accessibility to Higher Education in Nigeria: The Pains, Problems, and Prospects, January 2020, James Odia, University of Benin

External links 
https://allafrica.com/stories/201811010293.html
https://www.naijaonlinebiz.com/newly-approved-grading-system-for-nigerian-universities/
https://www.researchgate.net/figure/Grading-of-JAMB-UTME-score-Total-Marks-60_tbl2_338311460 
https://www.qmul.ac.uk/international-students/countries/nigeria/
https://www.undergraduate.study.cam.ac.uk/nigeria

See also 
Nigeria
Federal government of Nigeria
Grading in education

Nigeria
Education in Nigeria
Academia in Nigeria